Son Je-yong (or  ; born 12 January 1994) is a South Korean professional racing cyclist, who currently rides for UCI Continental team . He competed in the 2014 Asian Games and won a gold medal in team sprint.

References

External links

South Korean male cyclists
Asian Games gold medalists for South Korea
Korea National Sport University alumni
Sportspeople from Daegu
1994 births
Asian Games medalists in cycling
Cyclists at the 2014 Asian Games
Medalists at the 2014 Asian Games
Living people
Cyclists at the 2016 Summer Olympics
Olympic cyclists of South Korea
Cyclists at the 2018 Asian Games
20th-century South Korean people
21st-century South Korean people